Cedric Scott Hunter (born March 10, 1988) is an American former professional baseball outfielder. He previously played in Major League Baseball (MLB) for the San Diego Padres and Philadelphia Phillies.

Career

San Diego Padres
Hunter was selected by the San Diego Padres in the third round (93rd overall) of the 2006 Major League Baseball Draft. As of 2009, scout.com ranked Hunter as the top prospect for the San Diego Padres.  Following the 2010 season, he was added to the Padres' 40-man roster to protect him from the Rule 5 draft. On March 28, 2011, he made the 25-man opening day roster for the Padres.

During Opening Day on March 31, 2011, Hunter scored his first run as a Padre when playing against the St. Louis Cardinals, scoring from second base off a Nick Hundley single in the top of the 11th inning.

St. Louis Cardinals
On October 25, 2011, he was claimed off waivers by the Oakland Athletics. On April 4, 2012, the St. Louis Cardinals acquired Hunter from the Athletics for future considerations and assigned him to their AAA team.

Cleveland Indians
On November 20, 2012, Hunter signed a minor league deal with the Cleveland Indians that included an invitation to spring training.

Atlanta Braves
Hunter signed a minor league deal with the Atlanta Braves in February 2014. He elected free agency on November 7, 2015.

Philadelphia Phillies
Hunter signed a minor league deal and was invited to spring training with the Philadelphia Phillies on January 4, 2016. Following injuries to multiple outfielders and an impressive spring training, Hunter made the Opening Day roster, projected to earn regular playing time in the outfield.

On April 25, 2016, Hunter was outrighted off the 40-man roster. After the 2016 season concluded, Hunter was a free agent. However, on November 23, Hunter was suspended for 50 games after testing positive for amphetamine.

Cincinnati Reds
On April 5, 2017, Hunter signed a minor league deal with the Cincinnati Reds. He was released on June 26, 2017.

Kansas City T-Bones
On July 21, 2017, Hunter signed with the Kansas City T-Bones of the American Association.

Bravos de León
On March 11, 2018, Hunter signed with the Bravos de León of the Mexican League. He was released on December 24, 2019.

Awards
 2008 Baseball America High Class-A All-Star
 2008 California League postseason All-Star
 2008 California League midseason All-Star
 2006 Baseball America Rookie All-Star
 2006 Arizona League postseason All-Star
 2006 Arizona League Most Valuable Player

References

External links

1988 births
Living people
African-American baseball players
Akron Aeros players
Arizona League Padres players
American expatriate baseball players in Mexico
Baseball players from Georgia (U.S. state)
Bravos de León players
Columbus Clippers players
Eugene Emeralds players
Fort Wayne Wizards players
Gwinnett Braves players
Kansas City T-Bones players
Lake Elsinore Storm players
Major League Baseball center fielders
Memphis Redbirds players
Mexican League baseball outfielders
Mississippi Braves players
Naranjeros de Hermosillo players
Peoria Saguaros players
Philadelphia Phillies players
Portland Beavers players
San Antonio Missions players
San Diego Padres players
Tucson Padres players
21st-century African-American sportspeople
20th-century African-American people